Axis is a genus of deer occurring in South and Southeast Asia. As presently defined by most authorities, four species are placed in the genus. Three of the four species are called hog deer. The genus name is a word mentioned in Pliny the Elder's Natural History.

Species
Following the third edition of Mammal Species of the World from 2005, which is also followed by the American Society of Mammalogists, four species are placed in Axis. These four species are divided into two subgenera; Axis containing the chital, and Hyelaphus containing the 3 others.

References

Axis
Cervines
Mammal genera
Taxa named by Charles Hamilton Smith